Winning a Widow is a 1912 American silent film produced by Kalem Company and distributed by General Film Company. It was directed by Sidney Olcott with Gene Gauntier and Jack J. Clark in the leading roles.

Cast
 Gene Gauntier - The Widow
 Jack J. Clark - Jim White

Production notes
The film was shot in Luxor, Egypt.

External links

 Winning a Widow website dedicated to Sidney Olcott

1912 films
Silent American drama films
American silent short films
Films set in Egypt
Films shot in Egypt
Films directed by Sidney Olcott
1912 short films
1912 drama films
American black-and-white films
1910s American films